Thaeme Mariôto (born October 4, 1985) is a Brazilian pop singer and songwriter. She rose to fame after winning the second season of the reality television show Ídolos Brazil. After Idolos, she enjoyed a solo career, prior to joining the sertanejo duo Thaeme & Thiago alongside Thiago (real name José Lazaro Servo).

Biography
Thaeme was born on October 4, 1985 in Presidente Prudente, São Paulo, but was raised in Jaguapitã, Paraná. Thaeme began singing in the church choir in her hometown and never looked back. Teamed with her sister Priscilla and appeared in several TV shows, including Rede Record's Eliana's Talent Kids.

Thaeme's musical inspirations include Música popular brasileira and jazz divas. In 2009, she was elected as one of VIP Magazine's 100+ Sexies.

Ídolos Brazil

Overview

Mariôto auditioned for the second season of Ídolos Brazil in Florianópolis, Santa Catarina.

Performances

Career

2007–08: Idol Fame
Mariôto signed a recording contract with Sony BMG, managed by SBT in August 2007, as part of her Ídolos Brazil prize package. The contract expired late 2008.

Few weeks after the show's season finale, Sony BMG executives released Ídolos: Thaeme, a special album that contains only five tracks (sang during the show by Thaeme), including her Ídolos coronation song "Rotina". In less than a week, the first edition of the CD sold out in all the virtual stores: first place among the best sellers.

Studio recording sessions for the eponymous major label debut  Thaeme Mariôto: Tudo Certo (English: Thaeme Mariôto: All Right) ran in São Paulo, São Paulo, started in September 2006 and finished in November in the same year and was released on December 5, 2007, with the song "Rotina" (English: Routine) as her first single.

After "Rotina", she released two new singles "Tudo Certo" (English: All Right), which was later recorded by singer Luiza Possi. and "Ironia" (English: Irony), a song that was written by her own. A music video was filmed for that single and first premiered on August 31, 2008 on Thaeme's official YouTube channel.

2009–10: Post-Idol

In early-2009, Mariôto signed a recording contract with Lua Music. She rode three shows for specific audiences and recorded an album with many new songs including "Até os Anjos Choram" (English: Even Angels Cry), which including rapper Helião, from RZO, as first single. A music video was filmed late, 2009, and first premiered on December 21, 2009 on Thaeme's official YouTube channel. However, the album did not come out.

2011–present: Thaeme & Thiago

In 2011, Thaeme signed a new recording contract with Som Livre and is now the female part of the sertanejo–country duo Thaeme & Thiago. They released two studio albums and were managed by Socoraba from the duo Fernando & Sorocaba, a popular sertanejo–country duo.

In 2022, she performed cosplayed as a butterfly in the reality singing competition The Masked Singer Brasil.

Discography

Studio albums
Solo albums

Thaeme & Thiago
(for details, refer to Thaeme & Thiago page)
2011: Thaeme & Thiago
2012: Thaeme & Thiago: Ao Vivo em Londrina
2013: Perto de Mim

Singles
Solo singles

Featured in
2011: "06 de Janeiro de 2003" (Fernando & Sorocaba featuring Thaeme Mariôto)

Thaeme & Thiago
(for details, refer to Thaeme & Thiago page)

Soundtracks

References

External links
Thaeme & Thiago Official website
Thaeme Mariôto on Myspace

1985 births
Idols (TV series) winners
Living people
People from Presidente Prudente, São Paulo
21st-century Brazilian singers
21st-century Brazilian women singers